Edward Alexander Bergstrom (March 11, 1919 – March 21, 1973) was an ornithologist, scientific journal editor, and conservationist, doing all of his work in these fields as a volunteer.

Life
Edward Alexander Bergstrom was born in Boston, Massachusetts, the son of gardener and coachman Peter M. and governess Elizabeth Venable Bergstrom.  He attended Harvard University where he received BA and MA degrees in history in 1939 (graduating Magna cum laude) and 1940 respectively, and worked on a doctorate in history until 1942.

While he was at Harvard, his passion for ornithology flourished; he birded with noted ornithologists Ludlow Griscom, William H. Drury, Wendell Taber, Allan Cruickshank, Chandler Robbins, Charles Foster Batchelder and others in the Nuttall Ornithological Club. He met his future wife, Elizabeth Wasson (daughter of Isabel Bassett Wasson), who was also a birder, at the Audubon Nature Camp in Medomak, Maine in 1940.  They were married in 1943 and had five children, and he lived in West Hartford, Connecticut, for the rest of his life.   He died on March 21, 1973.

Bergstrom worked for Aetna Casualty & Surety Company (later called Aetna Life & Casualty and now Aetna, Inc.) in Hartford, Connecticut from 1943 until his death, starting as an underwriter and later (starting in 1964) working on a team to implement some of the first computer processing of automobile insurance claims.

His volunteer leadership roles in ornithology had a range of impacts from local to international.  He was President of the Hartford (CT) Bird Study Club (now the Hartford Audubon Society) from 1953 to 1955, and remained active in the group after that.  He was editor of the scientific journal Bird-Banding (now Journal of Field Ornithology) from 1950 to 1971, and served as Vice-President of the Northeastern Bird-Banding Association (NEBBA) from 1971 to 1973 (now the Association of Field Ornithologists or AFO), which published Bird-Banding and its successor.  From 1956 until his death in 1973, he imported and sold mist nets to bird banders from around the world for NEBBA, and served as their Assistant Treasurer, with the proceeds from the net sales supporting their publications.  He was also an active bird bander, banding over 35,000 birds in his lifetime, many of them in his own yard, and publishing several papers about his research on birds.  After his death, NEBBA established the E. Alexander Bergstrom Memorial Research Award in his honor, to fund research on birds, including banding studies by amateurs similar to the ones Bergstrom did.

Bergstrom was also a volunteer leader in conservation, on both the local and state level.  Bergstrom advocated the formation of the West Hartford Conservation Commission, became a charter member and chaired it from 1963 to 1966, and was a member through 1969.  He was also President of the Connecticut Association of Conservation Commissions (now the Connecticut Association of Conservation and Inland Wetlands Commissions).

In his conservation work, he advocated protection of undeveloped open spaces near where people lived.  He was instrumental in getting the town to purchase and develop Spicebush Swamp in West Hartford as a nature preserve, and also played a key role in helping the Hartford Audubon Society obtaining the  Lewis Farm in Suffield, CT as a bird sanctuary that is owned and managed by that group.  His role in preserving the latter property is recognized by a plaque on a boulder at the edge of the parking area.

References

Further reading
Connecticut Association of Conservation and Inland Wetlands Commissions
Hartford Audubon Society
Association of Field Ornithologists

1919 births
1973 deaths
American ornithologists
Harvard College alumni
20th-century American zoologists
Harvard Graduate School of Arts and Sciences alumni